Formas is a surname. Notable people with the surname include:

Emma Formas de Dávila (1883–?), Chilean artist
José Manuel Ortúzar Formas (1796–1848), Chilean lawyer and politician